Copromorpha aeruginea is a moth in the family Copromorphidae. It was described by Edward Meyrick in 1917.

It is found on the Comoros and Mauritius, as well as in South Africa. and has a wingspan of 17 mm.

References

Copromorphidae
Moths described in 1917